Carole Samaha (born July 25, 1972) is a Lebanese singer, actress, and performer. She has released six studio albums. Samaha has a Master's degree in acting and directing, which she earned in 1999 from the Saint Joseph University of Beirut.

In 2004 she won the Arab Music Award for best female newcomer. She has also won multiple Murex d'Or awards and was nominated for best Arabia New Act in the MTV Europe Music Awards 2008.

Before starting her pop music career, Carole Samaha was a classical actress and worked extensively with Mansour Rahbani and Marwan Rahbani.

In 2007 Carole Samaha returned to the theater to play Zenobia in the Rahbani musical with the same name. She appeared in the 2008 movie Bahr al nojoum alongside other Lebanese stars. She established her own production company, Lacarma, in 2009. In 2011 Carole Samaha starred in the TV series Al Shahroura, broadcast during Ramadan, as the singer and actress Sabah. In December 2012, Carole Samaha announced her plans to release a new album. In 2013 she was a judge on The X Factor (Arabic TV series) and she was the mentor for Young Pharoz, Maraya and Les Bledards Ninja. She created the musical show "The Lady" – produced by Rotana, premiering on Eid al-Fitr, August 10, 2013, in Casino du Liban.

Early life
Samaha was born on July 25, 1972 in Beirut to Antoine Samaha from Khenchara, Metn, a direct relative of Lebanese politician Shafik Mebarak Samaha and Nouhad Hawi from Dhour El Choueir, Metn. She has two brothers. Her parents supported different political factions, and according to Samaha that fact made her become "more open" to the different views of people, learning a great deal from that experience. Samaha is a direct relative of Lebanese politician Shafik Mebarak Samaha who left Zahlé, Lebanon for Colombia at the beginning of the 20th century.

Personal life
On November 1 2013, Samaha married Walid Mustafa, an Egyptian businessman, in a civil ceremony in Limassol, Cyprus following an 18-month courtship and short engagement. On August 31, 2015 Carole Samaha gave birth to a baby girl, Tala. She is a  Maronite Christian. From 2014, Samaha has been residing in Egypt with her husband.

Discography

Videography

Awards 
 "Revelation of the year" (actress and singer) Murex d'Or in 2000.
 "Best female newcomer" Arab Music Award (2003) – This was the first year for which Arab Music Awards were awarded and the ceremony was held in Dubai in May 2004.
 "Best Polyvalent talent" (actress and singer) Murex d'Or in 2003.
 "Best Female Romantic Song" ("Tala3 Fiyyi") Murex d'Or in 2003.
 "Best Lebanese Female Singer" Murex d'Or in 2007.
 "Best Lebanese Song" ("Ya Rab", with Marwan Khoury) Murex d'Or in 2007.
 "Best album of the year" (Hdoudi Sama, 2009) Murex d'Or in June 2010.
 "Best music video" – "Khalik Behalik" – at the 2011 Murex d'Or ceremony.
 World Music Award "Best Stage Performer in the Middle East" in Monaco 2014.

References

External links
 
 

Living people
1972 births
21st-century Lebanese women singers
Singers who perform in Classical Arabic
Lebanese Melkite Greek Catholics
Lebanese film actresses
Lebanese television actresses
Actresses from Beirut
Singers from Beirut